Rex Dyer (December 28, 1929 – November 4, 2004) was an American fencer. He competed in the team sabre events at the 1956 and 1960 Summer Olympics.

See also
 List of Pennsylvania State University Olympians

References

External links
 

1929 births
2004 deaths
American male sabre fencers
Olympic fencers of the United States
Fencers at the 1956 Summer Olympics
Fencers at the 1960 Summer Olympics
Sportspeople from Santa Fe, New Mexico
Pan American Games medalists in fencing
Pan American Games gold medalists for the United States
Pan American Games silver medalists for the United States
Pan American Games bronze medalists for the United States
Fencers at the 1955 Pan American Games